Queen Louise is a 1957 West German historical drama film directed by Wolfgang Liebeneiner and starring Ruth Leuwerik, Dieter Borsche and Bernhard Wicki. It was made at the Emelka Studios in Munich, with sets designed by the art director Rolf Zehetbauer.

The film depicts the life of Louise of Mecklenburg-Strelitz, the wife of Frederick William III of Prussia, and her stand against Napoleon during the Napoleonic Wars. It was one of a number of films made during the 1950s that portrayed historical royal Germany in a positive manner. It is similar in theme to the Prussian film genre which had been popular between the two World Wars including two previous films about Louise Queen Louise (1927) and Louise, Queen of Prussia (1931).

Cast
 Ruth Leuwerik as Königin Luise
 Dieter Borsche as König Friedrich Wilhelm
 Bernhard Wicki as Zar Alexander
 René Deltgen as Napoleon
 Hans Nielsen as Hardenberg
 Charles Regnier as Charles Maurice de Talleyrand-Périgord
 Peter Arens as Louis Ferdinand
 Friedrich Domin as Herzog von Mecklenburg-Strelitz
 Margarete Haagen as Gräfin Voss
 Irene Marhold as Friederike
 Alexander Golling as Großfürst Konstantin
 Ado Riegler as Von Köckritz
 Lotte Brackebusch as Bäuerin
 Joseph Offenbach as Bürgermeister

References

Bibliography

External links 
 

1957 films
1950s biographical drama films
1950s historical drama films
German biographical drama films
German historical drama films
West German films
1950s German-language films
Films directed by Wolfgang Liebeneiner
Films set in Berlin
Films set in the 1790s
Films set in the 1800s
Films set in the 1810s
Films set in Prussia
Biographical films about French royalty
Biographical films about German royalty
Louise of Mecklenburg-Strelitz
Depictions of Napoleon on film
Cultural depictions of Charles Maurice de Talleyrand-Périgord
Remakes of German films
Gloria Film films
Films shot at Bavaria Studios
1957 drama films
Films set in the Kingdom of Prussia
1950s German films